

Kanila Shree Bhagavathi Temple (Also known as Kanila Shree Bhagavithi Kshetra) is a Hindu Temple of Devi Baghavathi, located on the west side of National Highway 17, approximately  north of Hosangadi Junction of Manjeshwaram of Kerala state in India.

Kanila Shree Bhagavathi Kalabhavana

Kanila Shree Bhagavathi Kalabhavana (Kalabhavana in kannada language means Hall for Arts & Cultural activities) is located on the north side of the temple. This hall is administered by the Shree Kanila Bhagavathi Temple committee. This hall is available on request for promoting arts & cultural activities, wedding events/receptions, and other committee approved meeting or party events.

Kanila Shree Bhagavathi English Medium School

Kanila Shree Bhagavathi English medium School is a private school located on the south side of the temple. This school is serving good quality educations.

See also
Manjeshwaram
Kasaragod
 Ezhava/Thiya community
 Billava Community
Temples of Kerala
The school also provides quality and cultural activities to the local students of Manjeshwaram. Shri . B M Umesh is the President of the Kanila Bhagavathi Temple, The secretary is Mr. Gangadhar B.M, and the treasurer is Mr. Padmanabha Kadapara.

External links
Thiya Billava Website

Hindu temples in Kasaragod district

Bhagavathi temples in Kerala